Empire Design is a British film promotion agency founded by Stephen Burdge in 1996. The company has offices in London and New York, and specialises in creating print and audiovisual film campaigns for the UK and International film markets.

Clients include motion picture studios such as Universal Pictures, Disney/20th Century Studios, Sony Pictures, Paramount, and Working Title Films.

History
Established in 1996, Empire Design's early work included poster campaigns for movies such as Toy Story, Trainspotting and 12 Monkeys. In 2001, the company moved to its current location on Queen Anne Street, London. In 2002, Empire Design expanded into AV, and began making trailers, promos, television spots, radio spots and online and digital spots. Empire Design's trailers include Shaun Of The Dead, House of Flying Daggers, The Bourne Ultimatum, and Skyfall. In 2006, Empire Design opened an office on Elizabeth Street in New York's Lower East Side, and began creating domestic US campaigns for American television drama series including Mad Men and The Walking Dead. Empire Design has won several Golden Trailer Awards.

Notable Campaigns
 Trainspotting
 Kill Bill Volume 1
 Kill Bill Volume 2
 Sexy Beast
 Lock, Stock and Two Smoking Barrels
 House Of Flying Daggers
 Shaun Of The Dead
 The Bourne Supremacy
 The Bourne Ultimatum
 Toy Story 2
 Casino Royale
 Quantum Of Solace
 Skyfall

References

External links
 Empire Design Official Website
 Empire Design on IMDB
 Stephen Burdge Interview for Film4
 "Golden Trailer award for "House Of Flying Daggers"
 "Golden Trailer award for “Black Sheep”
 "Golden Trailer award for “Frost/Nixon”
 "Golden Trailer award for “Cemetery Junction”

Mass media companies of the United Kingdom